"Love Runs Out" is a song recorded by Dutch DJ and producer Martin Garrix, featuring American rapper G-Eazy and American singer Sasha Alex Sloan. The song was released on 6 August 2021 via Stmpd Rcrds and Epic Records.

Background
Garrix post a message on Instagram, announced the track was released on 6 August 2021 , then he liked a comment on Martin Garrix Hub’s Instagram, the collaboration with G-Eazy and Sloan was revealed.

Content
"Love Runs Out" describes an "afraid love story will fade out at one point" between G-Eazy and Sloan, then try to fix the relationship after they fall out of love.

Critical reception
Jason Heffler of edm.com commented the track "is a scintillating hip-pop anthem with enough horsepower in its liner notes to propel it."

Credits and personnel
Credits adapted from Tidal.

 Alex Hope – producer, composer, lyricist
 Martin Garrix – producer, composer, lyricist, associated performer, mastering engineer, mixing engineer
 Osrin – producer
 Tom Martin – producer
 Chloe Angelides – composer, lyricist
 G-Easy – composer, lyricist
 Oskar Rindborg – composer, lyricist
 Sasha Alex Sloan – composer, lyricist, associated performer
 Peppe Folliero – mastering engineer, mixing engineer
 Frank van Essen – Strings

Charts

Release history

References

2021 songs
2021 singles
Martin Garrix songs
G-Eazy songs
Sasha Alex Sloan songs
Songs written by Martin Garrix
Songs written by Alex Hope (songwriter)
Songs written by Chloe Angelides
Songs written by G-Eazy
Songs written by Sasha Alex Sloan
Stmpd Rcrds singles